The 1986 South Carolina gubernatorial election was held on November 4, 1986, to select the governor of the state of South Carolina. Carroll A. Campbell Jr., a Republican representative of the 4th congressional district, narrowly defeated Democrat Michael R. Daniel to become the 112th governor of South Carolina and only the second Republican governor since Reconstruction.

Democratic primary
The South Carolina Democratic Party held their primary for governor on June 10. Michael R. Daniel was declared the official candidate for the Democrats despite not obtaining 50% of the vote because second-place finisher, Winthrop University president Philip Lader, declined a runoff election.

Republican primary
Carroll A. Campbell, Jr. faced no opposition from South Carolina Republicans and avoided a primary election.

General election
The general election was held on November 4, 1986, and Carroll A. Campbell, Jr. was elected as the next governor of South Carolina in the closest election percentage wise since the disputed election of 1876. Turnout was higher than the previous gubernatorial election because of the increasingly competitive nature of the race between the two parties.

 
 

|-
| 
| colspan=5 |Republican gain from Democratic
|-

See also
Governor of South Carolina
List of governors of South Carolina
South Carolina gubernatorial elections

References

External links
SCIway Biography of Governor Carroll Ashmore Campbell, Jr.

1986
1986 United States gubernatorial elections
Gubernatorial